The Lebrun Islands are a group of uninhabited islands in the Solomon Sea, belonging to Papua New Guinea.

The Lebrun Islands belong to Louisiade Archipelago . They are located 12 km northwest of Wari Island and 22 km northeast of the Dumoulin Islands. Rika Rika is the larger of the two islands that make up the group. The highest elevation on Rika Rika is 109 m. Dogigi is located 4.5 km south of Rika Rika.
Administratively, the island belongs to Bwanabwana LLG (Local Level Government area) of the district Samarai-Murua in Milne Bay Province. They are administered in the Ward of Wari.

References

Islands of Milne Bay Province
Louisiade Archipelago
Archipelagoes of Papua New Guinea
Uninhabited islands of Papua New Guinea